Caio Canedo Corrêa (born 9 August 1990), known as Caio Canedo or simply Caio, is a professional footballer who plays as a forward or attacking midfielder for Emirati club Al Ain and the United Arab Emirates national team.

Born in Brazil, Caio acquired Emirati citizenship in 2020 in order to represent their national team.

Club career
In January 2013, Caio joined Internacional.

International career

East Timor 
Caio received his East Timorese passport in 2015, despite having no known means of eligibility such as a family connection or residency. An inquiry held by the Prime Minister of East Timor in 2016 heard that Caio was one of seven Brazilian footballers to receive falsified baptism documents from East Timor's Catholic Church in order to make it appear he was eligible for East Timorese nationality.

United Arab Emirates 
In January 2020, Caio acquired Emirati citizenship which qualified him to play for United Arab Emirates national team to compete at the 2022 FIFA World Cup qualification. Caio debuted in a friendly 3–2 win over Tajikistan on 12 November 2020.

Career statistics

Club

International
Scores and results list the United Arab Emirates' goal tally first.

Honours
Botafogo
 Campeonato Carioca: 2010

Internacional
 Campeonato Gaúcho: 2013, 2014

Al Ain
 UAE Pro League: 2021–22

Reference

External links

 

1990 births
Living people
People from Volta Redonda
Sportspeople from Rio de Janeiro (state)
Brazilian emigrants to the United Arab Emirates
Naturalized citizens of the United Arab Emirates
Brazilian footballers
Emirati footballers
Association football midfielders
Association football forwards
Volta Redonda FC players
Botafogo de Futebol e Regatas players
Figueirense FC players
Sport Club Internacional players
Esporte Clube Vitória players
Al-Wasl F.C. players
Al Ain FC players
Campeonato Brasileiro Série A players
UAE Pro League players
United Arab Emirates international footballers